Ivan Cherniavskyi (4 August 1930 – 2001) was a Ukrainian long-distance runner. He competed in the men's 5000 metres at the 1956 Summer Olympics, representing the Soviet Union.

References

External links
 

1930 births
2001 deaths
Athletes (track and field) at the 1956 Summer Olympics
Ukrainian male long-distance runners
Soviet male long-distance runners
Olympic athletes of the Soviet Union
Place of birth missing